Amburana acreana is a species of legume in the family Fabaceae. It is found in Bolivia, Brazil, and Peru. Its main threat is habitat loss.

References

Amburaneae
Flora of the Amazon
Vulnerable plants
Taxonomy articles created by Polbot
Taxa named by Adolpho Ducke